(literally "The Professor's Beloved Equation") is a novel by Yōko Ogawa set in modern-day Japan. It was published in Japan in August 2003, by Shinchosha. In 2009, the English translation by Stephen Snyder was published.

Background
The story centers around a mathematician, "the Professor," who suffered brain damage in a traffic accident in 1975 and since then can produce only 80 minutes' worth of memories, and his interactions with a housekeeper (the narrator) and her son "Root" as the Professor shares the beauty of equations with them. The novel's bibliography lists the book The Man Who Loved Only Numbers, a biography of the mathematician Paul Erdős. It has been said that Erdős was used as a model for the Professor.

The novel received the Hon'ya Taisho award, was adapted into a film version in January 2006, and after being published in paperback in December 2005, sold one million copies in two months, faster than any other Shinchosha paperback.

Plot summary 
The narrator's housekeeping agency dispatches her to the house of the Professor, a former mathematician who can remember new memories for only 80 minutes. She is more than a little frustrated to find that he loves only mathematics and shows no interest whatsoever in anything or anyone else. One day, upon learning that she has a 10-year-old son waiting home alone until late at night every day, the Professor flies into a rage and tells the narrator to have her son come to his home directly from school from that day on. The next day, her son comes and the Professor nicknames him "Root". From then on, their days begin to be filled with warmth.

Characters 
The Professor
64 years old. A former university professor who specializes in algebraic number theory. He loves mathematics, children, and the Hanshin Tigers (especially Yutaka Enatsu, who was playing for the Tigers at the time of the Professor's accident and whose uniform number was 28, the second smallest perfect number). After being in an auto accident at the age of 47, he can retain new memories for only 80 minutes. He keeps important information on notes that are attached all over his suits. He keeps baseball cards and other important mementos in a cookie tin. He has trouble interacting with other people and a habit of talking about numbers when he does not know what else to say. He has a talent for reading things backwards and finding the first star in the sky. His 80 minutes of memory eventually begins to fail, and thus he is moved to a nursing home where he spends the rest of his remaining days. But the Housekeeper, her son Root, and his sister-in-law continue to visit him. While the Housekeeper is working for him, he teaches her and Root about many of the math skills he knows and loves.
The Narrator/Housekeeper
The Professor's housekeeper and a single mother. She was hired by the Professor's sister-in-law through the housekeeping agency and is the tenth housekeeper the Professor has gone through. She initially feels frustration at the Professor, who shows interest only in mathematics, but through observing the Professor's kindness and his passion for mathematics, comes to feel respect and affection for him. She first manages to connect with the Professor when he discovers that her birthday is February 20 (220), which is an amicable number with the number 284, which is imprinted on the underside of his watch, which he received as the University President's Award for a thesis he wrote in university on transcendental number theory. She cannot pronounce the title of the Journal of Mathematics (to which the Professor submits contest entries) very well, so she refers to it as "Jaanaru obu." Towards the end of the novel and at a pivotal point in the story, she and Root give the Professor a rare baseball card of Yutaka Enatsu as a congratulatory present.
Root
Ten years old. The Housekeeper's son. The Professor refers to him as "Root" on account of the top of his head being flat like a square root symbol. He is the only character given something close to a name. He is an avid fan of baseball as well as the Hanshin Tigers just like the Professor, and gets the Professor to repair his old radio so that they can listen to baseball broadcasts together. His relationship with the Professor is close to that of a father and son, for the Professor is the first fatherly figure in his life. He eventually grows up to become a junior high school mathematics teacher.
The Widow/Sister-in-Law
Sister-in-law of the Professor (wife of the Professor's brother). Initially, she fired the Housekeeper for disregarding the employment contract rules (bringing her child into a client's home, staying past her assigned hours) and accused the Housekeeper's affection as an attempt to extort money from the Professor. However, after the Professor writes down Euler's formula during this confrontation, the Widow immediately comes to accept the Housekeeper and Root. She cannot walk well, which the Housekeeper later discovers was a result of her being in the same auto accident as the Professor. While browsing through the Professor's baseball card collection in the cookie tin, the Housekeeper discovers an old photograph of a younger Professor and his sister-in-law. It is hinted that perhaps long ago the Professor and his sister-in-law once had romantic feelings for each other.

Mathematical terminology that occurs in the story 

 root
 imaginary number
 factorial
 amicable number
 prime number
 twin prime
 perfect number
 abundant number
	
 deficient number
 triangular number
 Ruth-Aaron pair
 Mersenne prime
 Napier's constant
 Euler's formula
 Fermat's Last Theorem
 Artin's conjecture

Film 

A film based on the novel was released on January 21, 2006. It was directed by Takashi Koizumi.

In contrast to the original work, which is told from the perspective of the narrator, the film is shown from the perspective of 29-year-old "Root" as he recounts his memories of the Professor to a group of new pupils. Though there are a few differences between the film and the original work (for example, the movie touches on the relationship between the Professor and the widow, while the book does not give much detail), the film is generally faithful to the original.

Notes and references 

2003 Japanese novels
Japanese novels adapted into films
Shinchosha books
Novels by Yōko Ogawa